Dotter of Her Father's Eyes is a 2012 graphic novel written by Mary M. Talbot with artwork by her husband, Bryan Talbot. It is part memoir, and part biography of Lucia Joyce, daughter of modernist writer James Joyce.

Synopsis
Mary Talbot recounts her childhood in Preston, Lancashire, focussing upon her relationship with her father, Joycean scholar James S. Atherton. Talbot became a scholar herself, working in critical discourse analysis and publishing about language and gender.

The book juxtaposes Talbot's childhood with Lucia Joyce's -- the daughter of James Joyce. Inspired by Carol Shloss’s 2003 biography of Lucia, it covers her ambitions in dance and her deteriorating mental condition.

Writing
Bryan Talbot reflects on the differences in collaborating with his wife and his normal collaborations with writers. Explaining the process to the Sunderland Echo, Talbot says, "[t]he usual state of affairs is you get a script through the post or by email and that is the end of the collaboration. You illustrate, you design the page and tell the story. But this time, Mary would come down to the studio to watch me work and suggest things. I would suggest changes to the script to make it clearer or to get a point across, then we would discuss it over dinner.” Rather than have Bryan rework the art, Mary identified inaccuracies by inserting footnotes throughout the book.

Reception
The book was largely received positively by critics. Writing for The Observer, Rachel Cooke wrote that "[b]oth narratives are elegantly done. Talbot has a keen eye for the revealing detail, an important skill if you are working in comics. She makes connections, but never labours them." The Telegraphs review was similarly positive, labelling the book: "ambitious, entertaining and perceptive and blends a first-time script from Mary Talbot with stunning drawings and design from her husband, Bryan (Luther Arkwright, Grandville, Alice in Sunderland). It’s a small triumph." The book won the 2012 Costa biography award.

References

2012 comics debuts
2012 graphic novels
Autobiographical graphic novels
British graphic novels
British memoirs
Comics set in the United Kingdom
Comics set in Ireland
Costa Book Award-winning works
Jonathan Cape books
Comics based on real people
Child characters in comics
Comics set in the 1920s
Comics set in the 1930s
Comics set in the 1950s
Comics set in the 1960s
Works set in psychiatric hospitals
Psychotherapy in fiction
Fictional portrayals of schizophrenia